Carlos Eduardo Jaramillo Castillo (born 1932 in Loja) is an Ecuadorian poet.

He was awarded the Ecuadorian National Prize in Literature "Premio Eugenio Espejo" in 2007 by the President of Ecuador.

Works
 Escrito sobre la arena (1955) 
 150 poemas (1961)
 La Trampa (1964)
 Maneras de vivir y de morir (1965)
 La noche y los vencidos (1967)
 Las desvelaciones de Jacob (1970)
 El hombre que quemó sus brújulas (1970)
 Las desvelaciones de Jacob (1970) 
 Una vez la felicidad (1972) 
 Crónica de la casa, los árboles y el río (1973) 
 Viaje al planeta Eurídice (1973) 
 Perseo ante el espejo (1974) 
 Veinte años de poesía (1979 and 1985) 
 Blues de la calle Loja (1990) 
 Canciones levemente sadomasoquistas (2000)

References

1932 births
Ecuadorian male writers
Ecuadorian poets
Living people
People from Loja, Ecuador